The 29th Division may refer to:

Infantry divisions:
29th Division (German Empire)
29th Infantry Division (Wehrmacht)
29th Waffen Grenadier Division of the SS RONA (1st Russian)
29th Waffen Grenadier Division of the SS (1st Italian)
29th Infantry Division Piemonte, Kingdom of Italy
29th Infantry Division (Poland)
29th Division (Spain)
29th Division (United Kingdom)
29th Infantry Division (United States)
29th Division (Imperial Japanese Army)